Kerby Rychel (born October 7, 1994) is an American-born Canadian professional ice hockey forward who is currently an unrestricted free agent. He most recently played under contract with the Charlotte Checkers of the American Hockey League (AHL). He was selected by the Columbus Blue Jackets in the first round (19th overall) of the 2013 NHL Entry Draft. He was born in Torrance, California, but grew up in Tecumseh, Ontario. His father is 1996 Stanley Cup winner Warren Rychel.

Playing career
Rychel was originally selected 21st overall in the 2011 OHL Priority Selection by the Barrie Colts.

Rychel was rated as a top prospect and was a first-round selection at the 2013 NHL Entry Draft.

In his debut professional season in 2014–15, on an injury-plagued Blue Jackets roster, Rychel was recalled from AHL affiliate the Springfield Falcons and made his NHL debut on November 29, 2014, against the Nashville Predators.

Rychel gained notoriety during the 2015–16 NHL season when reports surfaced that he had requested a trade out of Columbus over his lack of playing time at the NHL level. Rychel and his father, who also serves as his agent, held a meeting with management during the Blue Jackets development camp, raising concerns over Rychel being "buried" on the team's depth chart. Ultimately though, Rychel was not traded during the season, and split time between the club and their new AHL affiliate, the Lake Erie Monsters. The Monsters finished as one of the top teams in the league, and ultimately won the Calder Cup.
 
On June 25, 2016, less than an hour after the conclusion of the 2016 NHL Entry Draft, Rychel was traded by the Blue Jackets to the Toronto Maple Leafs in exchange for defenseman Scott Harrington and a conditional 5th round pick (condition was not met). The Maple Leafs were rumoured to be one of the teams most interested in Rychel following his earlier trade request. On February 25, 2018, Rychel was traded along with Rinat Valiev and a 2018 second-round pick to the Montreal Canadiens in exchange for Tomáš Plekanec and Kyle Baun.

As an unsigned restricted free agent with the Canadiens over the summer, Rychel was traded by the Canadiens to the Calgary Flames in exchange for fellow restricted free agent, Hunter Shinkaruk, on August 20, 2018, and signed a one-year contract with the Flames.

On June 25, 2019, Rychel was not tendered a qualifying offer by the Flames, enabling him to become a free agent. Rychel paused his North American career, agreeing to his first contract abroad in signing a one-year contract with Swedish club Örebro HK of the Swedish Hockey League (SHL) on July 27, 2019. Approaching the 2019–20 season, Rychel sought and was released from his contract with Örebro HK in order to later sign a one-year contract with Russian club HC Neftekhimik Nizhnekamsk on September 3, 2019.

Rychel struggled to adapt to the KHL and was scoreless in just 7 games with Neftekhimik before his contract was terminated on October 8, 2019. Following his brief stint in the KHL, Rychel returned to North America and opted to resume his career in the AHL, by agreeing to a one-year contract with the Charlotte Checkers, affiliate of the Carolina Hurricanes, on November 19, 2019. He notched 1 assist in 6 games with the Checkers before he was suspended by the team and removed from the roster.

International play
During the 2010–11 season, Rychel won a gold medal with Team Ontario at the 2012 World U-17 Hockey Challenge, and during the 2011–12 season he won a bronze medal with Team Canada at the 2012 IIHF World U18 Championships. During the 2012–13 season he was an invited participant at the 2013 CHL Top Prospects Game.

Career statistics

Regular season and playoffs

International

Awards and honors

References

External links
 

1994 births
Living people
American men's ice hockey left wingers
Calgary Flames players
Canadian ice hockey left wingers
Charlotte Checkers (2010–) players
Columbus Blue Jackets draft picks
Columbus Blue Jackets players
Guelph Storm players
Ice hockey players from California
Lake Erie Monsters players
Laval Rocket players
Mississauga St. Michael's Majors players
Montreal Canadiens players
National Hockey League first-round draft picks
HC Neftekhimik Nizhnekamsk players
Sportspeople from Torrance, California
Springfield Falcons players
Stockton Heat players
Toronto Marlies players
Windsor Spitfires players